Martin Natchaba Adouna (born 31 December 1943) is a Togolese former athlete. He competed in the men's long jump at the 1972 Summer Olympics.

References

External links
 

1943 births
Living people
Athletes (track and field) at the 1972 Summer Olympics
Togolese male long jumpers
Olympic athletes of Togo
21st-century Togolese people